The men's 4x4 beach volleyball tournament at the 2019 World Beach Games in Doha, Qatar, the inaugural edition of the ANOC World Beach Games, will take place over five days from 12–16 October. Held in tandem with the women's tournament, the two events comprise the 4x4 beach volleyball competition at this year's Games.

Organised by the Association of National Olympic Committees (ANOC), national associations of FIVB (4x4 beach volleyball's governing body) from a territory with a National Olympic Committee (NOC) were invited to enter one team  from which 8 teams.

The tournament is a multi-stage competition, consisting of a round-robin group stage and followed by a single elimination knockout round, starting with the semi-finals and ending with the gold medal match.

Competition schedule
The tournament will begin on 12 October, after the opening ceremony, and end on the final day of the Games, 16 October.

Matches deciding medal winners will take place exclusively on 16 October.

Qualified teams
Each National Olympic Committee might enter up to one men's and one women's team in the 4x4 beach volleyball tournaments. The qualification processes for the men's and women's events were similar. The host country was guaranteed an entry in each event. The five spots were awarded to the best FIVB Beach Volleyball World Rankings for each continental federation. 2 more spots were awarded to invitation (wild card) process.

Venues

The matches will be held on the Katara Beach. The number of arenas that will be used is yet to be revealed.

Squads
Each team may enter a squad consisting of up to 6 players. A total of up to 48 athletes are expected to compete.

Pools composition
Teams were seeded in the first two positions of each pool following the Serpentine system according to their FIVB Beach Volleyball World Rankings as of 30 June 2019. FIVB reserved the right to seed the hosts as heads of pool A regardless of the World Ranking.

Pool standing procedure
 Match points (2 for the winner, 1 for the loser, 0 for forfeit)
 Between 2 teams consider all teams points ratio / Between 3 teams consider head-to-head points ratio
 Seeding position of the pools composition

Preliminary round
All times are Arabia Standard Time (UTC+03:00).

Pool A

Pool B

Knockout stage
All times are Arabia Standard Time (UTC+03:00).

Quarter-finals

Semi-finals

Bronze medal game

Gold medal game

Final ranking

See also
4x4 beach volleyball at the 2019 World Beach Games – Women's tournament

References

2019 World Beach Games events
Beach volleyball at multi-sport events